Dale Schilly (born in St. Louis, Missouri) is an American soccer coach.

He attended Rosary High School, which today is part of Trinity Catholic High School, and Florida International University.

In addition to his coaching duties, Schilly is also the director of the St. Louis Scott Gallagher-Illinois youth soccer organization. He holds a USSF "A" coaching license.

Coaching career

AC St. Louis
On June 24, 2010, Schilly was named the new head coach of AC St. Louis, a team that had just begun playing that year in the USSF Division 2 Professional League. The club appointed Schilly after starting the season with a disappointing 2-7-1 record under outgoing coach Claude Anelka. Schilly's introduction improved the team's fortunes, leading them to a 5-8-7 record under his management. Despite this improvement, AC St. Louis ceased operation after the 2010 season due to financial issues.

Saint Louis FC
On May 1, 2014, USL PRO announced an expansion team in St. Louis for the 2015 season, named Saint Louis FC and owned by St. Louis Scott Gallagher. The team announced that Dale Schilly would be their first head coach.

Achievements

Florida International University

NCAA Men's Division II Soccer Championship Winner - 1982

References

Living people
Sportspeople from St. Louis
Florida International University people
American soccer coaches
AC St. Louis coaches
Saint Louis FC coaches
Year of birth missing (living people)